Borja Fernández Fernández (born 16 August 1995) is a Spanish footballer who plays for Algeciras CF as a central midfielder.

Club career
Born in Vigo, Galicia, Fernández played youth football with hometown club RC Celta de Vigo, and signed a four-year professional contract on 26 February 2013. He made his senior debut with the reserves in the 2013–14 season, in Segunda División B.

Fernández made his first-team – and La Liga – debut on 24 August 2014, starting in a 3–1 home win against Getafe CF. The following day, he extended his contract until 2019.

On 20 July 2017, Fernández was loaned to Segunda División side CF Reus Deportiu for one year. He scored his first goal as a professional on 22 October, being essential as the visitors beat UD Almería 1–0.

On 7 August 2018, Fernández terminated his contract with Celta. In the following years, he played abroad with Miedź Legnica (Poland) and Asteras Tripolis FC (Greece).

References

External links

1995 births
Living people
Spanish footballers
Footballers from Vigo
Association football midfielders
La Liga players
Segunda División players
Segunda División B players
Primera Federación players
Celta de Vigo B players
RC Celta de Vigo players
CF Reus Deportiu players
Algeciras CF footballers
Ekstraklasa players
Miedź Legnica players
Super League Greece players
Asteras Tripolis F.C. players
Spain youth international footballers
Spanish expatriate footballers
Expatriate footballers in Poland
Expatriate footballers in Greece
Spanish expatriate sportspeople in Poland
Spanish expatriate sportspeople in Greece